Viktor Poltavets may refer to

 Viktor Poltavets (politician)
 Viktor Poltavets (artist)